Boolean operation or Boolean operator may refer to:

Boolean function, a function whose arguments and result assume values from a two-element set
Boolean operation (Boolean algebra), a logical operation in Boolean algebra (AND, OR and NOT)
Boolean operator (computer programming), part of a Boolean expression in a computer programming language
An operation or operator as characterized in the logical truth table
Logical operator, in logic, a logical constant used to connect two or more formulas
Set operation (Boolean), a set-theoretic operation in the algebra of sets (union, intersection, and complementation)
Boolean operations on polygons, an application to polygon sets in computer graphics